Colin Slater Jr. (born October 29, 1997) is an American basketball player for Bornova Belediyespor of the Turkish Basketbol Süper Ligi. He played college basketball for the Long Beach State Beach and the Tulane Green Wave.

High school career
Slater began his high school career at the Clovis North Educational Center. He subsequently transferred to Immanuel High School. Slater was named the 2015 Fresno Bee player of the year, leading Immanuel to a Central Section Division IV championship after scoring 20 points against William Howard Taft Charter High School. He committed to play college basketball at Tulane.

College career
Slater played sparingly during two years at Tulane, averaging 2.7 points per game as a sophomore. He opted to transfer to Long Beach State and sat out the 2018-19 season as a redshirt. Slater averaged 10.2 points and 2.4 rebounds per game as a junior. He initially decided to opt-out of the 2020-21 season due to COVID-19 concerns but opted-in after the fall semester. Slater was named the 2022 Big West Player of the Year after helping lead Long Beach State to a regular season Big West title. He averaged 14.4 points and 2.8 rebounds per game.

References

External links
 Long Beach State Beach bio
 Tulane Green Wave bio

1997 births
Living people
American expatriate basketball people in Turkey
American men's basketball players
Basketball players from California
Bornova Belediye players
Long Beach State Beach men's basketball players
Point guards
Sportspeople from Fresno, California
Tulane Green Wave men's basketball players